Protapirus (Latin: "before" (pro), + Brazilian Indian: "tapir" (tapira)) is an extinct genus of tapir known from the Oligocene and Miocene of North America and Eurasia.

Taxonomy
The type species is Protapirus priscus from the Late Oligocene of Quercy, France. 
Protapirus is often considered the earliest true tapir, or at least a tapiroid who is the direct ancestor of the true tapir family (but not modern tapirs).

Distribution and history

The oldest species is the North American P. simplex from the White River Formation. A later North American species is P. obliquidens From North America, the genus spread into Eurasia during the Oligocene, with five species known from the Oligocene and Miocene of Europe and a single species (P. gromovae) from Kazakhstan.

Description

They were of similar size to modern tapirs, but had more primitive features, such as premolars that were less molariform in shape. In comparison to more primitive tapiroids, Protapirus had retracted nasal region which may indicate the presence of a trunk. However, the nasals were not as shortened as in modern tapirs, so the proboscis would have likely been less prominent.

References

Prehistoric tapirs
Prehistoric placental genera
Oligocene odd-toed ungulates
Miocene odd-toed ungulates
White River Fauna
Oligocene mammals of Europe
Oligocene mammals of Asia
Oligocene mammals of North America
Miocene mammals of Europe
Miocene mammals of Asia
Miocene mammals of North America